The 1986 Ice Hockey World Championships took place in the Soviet Union from 12 to 28 April. The games were played at the Luzhniki Palace of Sports and the CSKA Ice Palace in Moscow, and eight teams took part. Each team played each other once, and then The four best teams then played each other once more with no results carrying over, and the other four teams played each other again to determine ranking and relegation.  This was the 51st World Championships, and also the 62nd ice hockey European Championships. The reigning world champions from Czechoslovakia finished fifth, and the Soviet Union became World Champions for the twentieth time, and also won their 24th European Championship. In the European Championship, only mutual games between European teams in the first round were counted.  For the disappointing Czechoslovaks, this was the first time since 1967 that they had finished out of the medals, and their worst result outside the Olympics since 1937.

Attracting little notice at the time, Brett Hull made his debut in international hockey for the United States.  It would appear that if Canadian coach Dave King had invited him to play in Moscow, the college student with dual citizenship, would have happily chosen a different path. Instead he chose to accept coach Dave Peterson's offer to compete for the Americans.

World Championship Group A (Soviet Union)

First round

Final Round

Consolation round

Poland, needing a win of four goals or more on the final day, tied, and were relegated

World Championship Group B (Netherlands)
Played in Eindhoven 20–29 March. The Swiss, narrowly failing to gain promotion in last year's tournament, made no mistake this year, losing only in a final meaningless game against East Germany. On the last day of competition, four different nations were in danger of relegation, with a myriad of tie breaking scenarios.

Depending on the results of the final day, two of Austria, Japan, the Netherlands, and Yugoslavia would be relegated. In the first game Yugoslavia played Japan with the loser being relegated. A five to zero score relegated Japan. In the next game, Italy beat France, assuring the Austrians of safety from relegation. The Dutch had their fate in their own hands in the last game, a win and they would remain, a loss and they would be relegated. The unfortunate Yugoslavian team had to watch all day and hope, a hope dashed by a Dutch three to two win over Austria.

Switzerland was promoted to Group A. Yugoslavia and Japan were relegated to Group C.

World Championship Group C (Spain)
Played in Puigcerda 23 March to 1 April.

First round
Group C was expanded this year, ten teams were divided into two groups of five.  The top two from each group played off for first, while third and fourth places played off for fifth through eighth.   Mutual games from the first round were carried forward and counted in the second round.  The two last place teams were relegated to the first Group D.

Group 1

South Korea was relegated to Group D.

Group 2

Australia was relegated to Group D.

Final Round

Norway and China were both promoted to Group B.

Consolation round

Ranking and statistics

Tournament Awards
Best players selected by the directorate:
Best Goaltender:       Peter Lindmark
Best Defenceman:       Viacheslav Fetisov
Best Forward:          Vladimir Krutov
Media All-Star Team:
Goaltender:  Peter Lindmark
Defence:  Viacheslav Fetisov,  Alexei Kasatonov
Forwards:  Vladimir Krutov,  Igor Larionov,  Sergei Makarov

Final standings
The final standings of the tournament according to IIHF:

European championships final standings
The final standings of the European championships according to IIHF:

Scoring leaders
List shows the top skaters sorted by points, then goals.
Source:

Leading goaltenders
Only the top five goaltenders, based on save percentage, who have played 50% of their team's minutes are included in this list.
Source:

Citations

References

IIHF Men's World Ice Hockey Championships
World Championships
World Ice Hockey Championships
International ice hockey competitions hosted by the Soviet Union
April 1986 sports events in Europe
Sports competitions in Moscow
1986 in Moscow
1986 in Russian sport
International ice hockey competitions hosted by the Netherlands
International ice hockey competitions hosted by Spain
1985–86 in Dutch ice hockey
1985–86 in Spanish ice hockey
March 1986 sports events in Europe
Sports competitions in Eindhoven
20th century in Eindhoven
1986 in Catalonia
Sports competitions in Catalonia